Kalle Vellevoog (born April 14, 1963, in Tallinn) is a notable Estonian architect.

Kalle Vellevoog studied in the State Art Institute of the Estonian SSR (today's Estonian Academy of Arts) in the department of architecture. He graduated from the academy in 1986.

From 1986 to 1990 Kalle Vellevoog worked in the Tallinn office of the soviet design bureau Tsentrosojuz Projekt. From 1990 Kalle Vellevoog works in the architectural bureau JVR OÜ.

Most notable works by Kalle Vellevoog are the housing area of Seedri street in Pärnu, the apartment building on Kaupmehe street, the apartment building on Pähkli street and the apartment building on Seedri street. Kalle Vellevoog is a member of the Union of Estonian Architects and from 1998 to 2002 was the chairman of the union and in 2002 to 2004 the vice chairman.

Works
Apartment building on Suur-Patarei street, 1998
Office building on Türi Street, 1999 (with Velle Kadalipp)
Private houses on Seedri Street in Pärnu, 2003
Apartment building on Kaupmehe Street, 2004 (with Velle Kadalipp)
Apartment building in Pärnu, 2004
Housing area in Tallinn, 2005 (with Velle Kadalipp)
Apartment building on Tatari Street, 2005 (with Velle Kadalipp)
Apartment building in Haapsalu, 2006
Office building in Tallinn, 2006
Apartment building on Seedri Street in Pärnu, 2007

References
Union of Estonian Architects
Architectural Bureau JVR OÜ, architects

1963 births
Living people
Architects from Tallinn
Recipients of the Order of the White Star, 3rd Class
Estonian Academy of Arts alumni